Oinophila is a small genus of the fungus moth family, Tineidae. Therein, it belongs to the subfamily Hieroxestinae.

O. v-flava, often misspelled "-flavum", is commonly known as the wine moth. Its caterpillars borrow into moist cork – such as of wine bottles stored in a damp cellar – in search of the mould which they primarily eat.

Species
Oinophila is only a minor lineage in a small subfamily, but the notoriety of the well-known wine moth made it quite well known. In the past, it was thus used as a sort of "wastebin taxon" for miscellaneous Hieroxestinae. Four species remain in the genus at present, but two of these do not actually seem to belong here – they might not even be Hieroxestinae: 
 Oinophila argyrospora  Meyrick, 1931 (provisionally placed here)
 Oinophila nesiotes Walsingham, 1908
 Oinophila v-flava (Haworth, 1828)
 Oinophila xanthorrhabda  Meyrick, 1915 (provisionally placed here)

See also
 Cork moth (Nemapogon cloacella), another tineid moth occasionally feeding on cork of wine bottles.

Footnotes

References

  (2003): Stored Product Insects – Oinophila v-flavum (Wine Moth) [sic]. Retrieved 2010-MAY-01.
  (2004): Butterflies and Moths of the World, Generic Names and their Type-species – Oinophila. Version of 2004-NOV-05. Retrieved 2010-MAY-01.
  [2010]: Global Taxonomic Database of Tineidae (Lepidoptera). Retrieved 2010-MAY-01.

Hieroxestinae
Tineidae genera